First Methodist Church is a historic Methodist church building at 215 W. Cherokee Street in Brookhaven, Mississippi.

It was built in 1916 and added to the National Register in 1997.

References

Methodist churches in Mississippi
Churches on the National Register of Historic Places in Mississippi
Neoclassical architecture in Mississippi
Churches completed in 1916
National Register of Historic Places in Lincoln County, Mississippi
Neoclassical church buildings in the United States